Dodwell Francis Browne (1841–1920) was an Irish barrister. He was appointed a Puisne Justice of the Supreme Court of Ceylon in 1895.

Life
He was the son of Neal O'Donel Browne of Rathain (Rahins, Raheens) and his wife Sarah Labertouche, daughter of Abel Labertouche. With a B.A. from Trinity College, Dublin, he was admitted to the Middle Temple in 1865. He graduated LL.B. from Trinity College, and was called to the Irish Bar.

Browne was admitted an advocate of the Ceylon Supreme Court in 1872. He was a judge of the Colombo District Court from 1893 to 1903.

In 1903 Browne retired on a pension. He became a Justice of the Peace in County Mayo, and resided on his estate. He died at home in July 1920.

Family
Browne married in 1871 Annabella Glenny, daughter of Samuel Glenny of Liverpool. They had three sons and a daughter, of whom the eldest, Dodwell Browne, graduated M.B. at Trinity College, Dublin, and emigrated to Western Australia.

References

Citations

Bibliography

 

1841 births
1920 deaths
Puisne Justices of the Supreme Court of Ceylon
British expatriates in Sri Lanka
19th-century British people
19th-century Sri Lankan people